Fiery Creek may refer to:
Fiery Creek (Victoria), a watercourse in the Australian state of Victoria, Australia.
Streatham, Victoria is a town on the lower reaches of the creek known as Fiery Creek until 1854
Raglan, Victoria the town nearest the area of the 1850s Fiery Creek gold rush
Fiery Creek (Queensland), watercourse(s) in the Australian state of Queensland
Fiery Creek (New Zealand), a watercourse in the Otago region of New Zealand